Natalia Vitoldivna Gorbenko (born 3 February 1970) is a Ukrainian former competitive figure skater for the Soviet Union. After becoming the 1986 World Junior champion, she won five senior international medals and the 1989 Soviet national title. She placed as high as 5th at the European Championships and 8th at the World Championships.

After Gorbenko moved to the United Kingdom, she competed in the British Championships, placing second.

Results

References

Navigation

Soviet female single skaters
Ukrainian female single skaters
Living people
1970 births
World Junior Figure Skating Championships medalists
Sportspeople from Kyiv